James Hengist Reeve, born 25 June 1950, is an English broadcaster, journalist, raconteur and radio phone-in host based in the Manchester area. Reeve has hosted shows on Piccadilly Radio, BBC GMR (now BBC Radio Manchester), BBC Radio 5 Live, The New Hallam FM, talkSPORT, TEAMtalk 252 stations and, up until July 2006, presented the late night phone-in show at Key 103.

BBC GMR
Reeve joined the Manchester BBC Local radio station GMR in April 1995, presenting the afternoon show. In April 1998, he rejected an opportunity to join new station Century Radio to stay with GMR. Just a few months later, he left GMR in controversial circumstances with Reeve claiming he had been unfairly dismissed and had to explain complaints of "gratuitous use of racist language on and off-air."

Career chronology
Late 1970s-1981 Piccadilly Radio
February 1986-mid-1994 Piccadilly Radio (Saturday Sport, late night phone-in until 1989 then breakfast show)
June 1994 - Fortune 1458
Mid 1994 - April 1995 - The New Hallam FM (now Hallam FM) (late night phone-in)
April 1995-September 1998 GMR (now BBC Radio Manchester) 
1999-2000 TalkSPORT
2000 105.4 Century Radio (football phone-in show)
2002 TeamTalk 252
June 2005-July 2006 Key 103 (late night phone-in)
May 2008 106.1 Rock Radio
September 2008 - May 2009 96.2 The Revolution

Surgery
In July 2006, Reeve had his gall bladder removed at Manchester Royal Infirmary by surgeon Jon Bell, son of Colin Bell, formerly of Manchester City Football Club and England.

External links
 Long time hillman Gary Burt and assorted James gags circa 2000
 Hear James during his short stint on the now defunct TEAMtalk 252 in Summer 2002
 
 Simon Sandiford-Mitchell's JHR site
 Manchester Evening News article re James' departure from Key103
 DJ's fight with BBC - Lancashire Evening Telegraph article from 21 Sept 2001

References

British radio personalities
British radio DJs
Living people
People from Prestwich
1950 births